George Pirkhamer (also Georg Pirkhamer or Jörg Pirkhamer) was a Roman Catholic theologian and prior at Nuremberg, Germany in the 15th century.

See also

References

Year of birth missing
Year of death missing
German Christian monks
Priors